Raffaele Casnédi (September 26, 1822 – December 29, 1892) was an Italian painter and scenic designer, active mainly in Milan.

He was born to Pietro Casnedi and Angela Spaini. Despite his parents' objections, he attended the Accademia di Brera from 1840 to 1850. There he studied under Sogni and Luigi Sabatelli. In 1852, he won the Mylius prize for the fresco of The school of Leonardo painted in a lunette for the Accademia. He interned in Rome, where he befriended the landscape artist Costa. He returned to Milan, and joined the Brera in 1856, and as professor of design in 1860.

He is best known for his frescoes and religious canvases conserved at the churches (in Valmadrera, Besana, Rho, San Pietro in Novara, and Palombara). For example, in the parochial church of Santi Pietro e Paolo in Luino, he painted, among other works, the four evangelists in the spandrels of the dome. In collaboration with Giuseppe Bertini, he painted the curtain or sipario (1861–1863) at the Teatro alla Scala with The Fables Atellanae. Among the pupils at the Brera of Casnédi (as well as Bertini and Hayez) were the Scapigliatura artists: Pietro Bouvier and Francesco Didioni, and the Divisionists, Angelo Morbelli and Giovanni Sottocornola. Bartolomeo Giuliano was one of his assistants.

Sources
Treccani encyclopedia entry

Note

1822 births
1892 deaths
People from Varese
Painters from Milan
Brera Academy alumni
Academic staff of Brera Academy
19th-century Italian painters
Italian male painters
19th-century Italian male artists